St Hugh in the Carthusian Refectory is a 1655 painting by Francisco de Zurbarán, now in the Museum of Fine Arts of Seville.

In front of each Carthusian is a terracotta bowl with meat and pieces of bread. Two terracotta jugs, an overturned bowl and two abandoned knives for cutting the meat.

It shows Bruno of Cologne and the six other founder members of the Carthusian order being served a meal by Hugh of Châteauneuf (then bishop of Grenoble) and his page. One day Hugh had sent them meat and - whilst discussing whether it was right to break their fast and accept the gift - they fell into an ecstatic dream. Forty-five days later Hugh sent a message that he was coming to see them but his messenger returned and reported that the Carthusians were still sitting in front of the meat despite it being Lent. Hugh arrived at the monastery and as the monks woke up Hugh asked Bruno the date in the church calendar. He told him a date forty-five days earlier and explained their debate over whether to accept his meat. Hugh then lent towards their plates and saw the meat turn into ash. The monks thus came to the decision that there could be absolutely no exception to their rule against eating meat.

References

Paintings by Francisco de Zurbarán
Hugh
Paintings in the Museum of Fine Arts of Seville
Food and drink paintings
1655 paintings